Christopher Ryan is an English actor.

Christopher or Chris Ryan may also refer to:

Chris Ryan (born 1961), British soldier and novelist
Chris Ryan (rugby league) (born 1973), Australian rugby league footballer
Chris Ryan (Australian rules footballer) (1879–1973), Australian rules footballer with Carlton
Christopher Ryan (author) (born 1962), American author
Chris Ryan (hurler) (1899–?), Irish hurler
Christy Ryan (Christopher D. Ryan, 1957–2021), Irish Gaelic footballer, hurler and coach
C. J. Ryan (Christopher John Ryan, 1943–2004), British priest and scholar of Italian studies
Christopher Ryan, candidate in the United States House of Representatives elections in Missouri, 2010